Cristo Redentor is the debut album by Harvey Mandel. Richie Unterberger of AllMusic writes that "Mandel's debut remains his best early work." John Tobler wrote in the liner notes of the CD that Mandel "was good enough to be invited to audition for The Rolling Stones and he worked with John Mayall and Canned Heat - but it is for this Cristo Redentor album, and particularly for the utterly classic Wade in the Water that he will be remembered." This album is completely instrumental with the exception of the title track where soprano Jacqueline May Allen, joined by Carolyn Willis, Edna Wright and Julia Tillman Waters, blend their wordless voices as if another instrument.

Track listing

Personnel
Harvey Mandel - guitar
Peter Drake - steel guitar
Art Stavro - bass at New York sessions
Bob Moore - bass (with help from Hargus Robbins)
Hargus Robbins - piano, "chauffeur"
Kenny Buttrey - drums
Eddie Hoh - drums at New York sessions
Chip Martin - rhythm guitar
Bob Jones - rhythm guitar on "Snakes" and "Lights Out"
Nick De Caro - piano on "Cristo Redentor"
Charlie Musselwhite - harp on "The Lark" and "Long Wait"
Barry Goldberg - organ, electric piano on "The Lark" and "Long Wait"
Steve Miller - organ, piano on "Cristo Redentor", "Before Six" and "Wade in the Water"
Larry Easter - tenor saxophone on "Before Six"
Armando Peraza - conga on "Wade in the Water"
Carter C.C. Collins - conga on "Before Six"
Grahame Bond - piano on "You Can't Tell Me" (credited on rear cover but the song isn't listed or included on the album)
Jacqueline May Allen (Soprano), Carolyn Willis, Edna Wright, Julia Tillman Waters - voices on "Cristo Redentor"
Catherine Gotthofer - harp on "Cristo Redentor"
Nick De Caro, Steve Miller and Larry Easter - string and horn arrangements

Production
Producer on Tracks 1-10: Believed to be Abe Kesh
Producer on Track 11: Lewis Merenstein and Barry Goldberg
Producer on Track 12-13: Skip Taylor and Canned Heat
Producer on Track 14: Skip Taylor and Jim Taylor
Producer on Tracks 15-17: Skip Taylor
Producer on Track 18: Skip Taylor assisted by John Stronach and Arthur Lee

LP track order was taken from the original vinyl record. All other track information and credits were taken from the CD liner notes.

References

External links
Philips Records Official Site 

1968 debut albums
Philips Records albums